Les Achards is a commune in the department of Vendée, western France. The municipality was established on 1 January 2017 by merger of the former communes of La Mothe-Achard (the seat) and La Chapelle-Achard.

Geography

Climate

Les Achards has a oceanic climate (Köppen climate classification Cfb).

Population

See also 
Communes of the Vendée department

References 

Communes of Vendée
States and territories established in 2017
2017 establishments in France